This is an incomplete List of ghost towns in Florida sortable by name, county, or coordinates. Note that the county names are modern (as of 2018); in several cases, the ghost town, when inhabited, was in a different county than the modern one.

 Note: some 19th-Century Florida maps show longitude west of Washington (WW), which is approximately 77°2.8' west of Greenwich (WG).

Notes and references

External links
 Map of coordinates from this page

 
Florida
Ghost towns
Ghost